Syed Jalaluddin Umri (1935 – 26 August 2022) was an Islamic scholar and writer. He was the Amir of Jamaat-e-Islami Hind from 2007 to 2019.

Early life and education
Jalaluddin Umri was born in 1935 in a village called Puttagram, District of North Arcot, Tamil Nadu, British India. He was a graduate of Jamia Darussalam, Oomerabad, Tamil Nadu. He received a master's degree in Islamic Studies from Jamia Darussalam. He also received a bachelor's degree in English literature from Aligarh Muslim University.

Association with Jamaat-e-Islami Hind 
Jalaluddin Umri began his association with Jamaat-e-Islami Hind during his student years. After completing his studies, he dedicated himself to its research department. He officially became its member in 1956. He served as the city Ameer of Jama'at of Aligarh for a decade, and the editor of its monthly Zindagi-e-Nau for five years. Later, the Jama'at elected him to its All-India deputy Ameer, which he served for four consecutive terms (sixteen years).  In 2007, the Jama'at's Central Council of Representatives elected him its Ameer (Chief). He was again re-elected as Jama'at's Ameer in 2011.

Jalaluddin Umri was elected as Ameer, Jamaat-e-Islami Hind for the fourth term (April 2015 – March 2019).

In March 2019, Republic TV news channel had to issue an unconditional apology to Jalaluddin Umri for wrongly carrying his image during their broadcast of the news. This TV channel later announced that it had taken down its video related to Jalaluddin Umri from YouTube.

Positions held
Jamaat-e-Islami Hind – Chief leader or Amir from 2007 to 2019
All India Muslim Personal Law Board – vice-president (2011 – 2019)
Jamiatul Falah (rector of Jamiatul Falah organization, Azamgarh, Uttar Pradesh in 2011)
 Editor of Tahqiqat-e-Islami (a quarterly magazine) in 2011

Academic Activities and Selected works 
Jalaluddin Umri was widely-considered, among the Islamic circles of India, an authority on human rights and Muslim family system.

Jalaluddin Umri had written many books in Urdu language, later translated in various languages: 
Maroof wa Munkar 
Islam ki Dawat 
Musalman Aurat ke Huquuq aur Un par aeterazaat ka Jaiza (Rights of Muslim Women - A Critique of the Objections)
SeHat-o-marz aur Islam ki Taleemat
Islam meN khidmat-e-khalq ka Tasawwur (Social Service in Islam)
Inabat Ilallah"
 Sabeele Rab Islam Aur Manav Adhikkar State of Our Community and Nation and Our Responsibilities''

Personal life and death 
Jalaluddin Umri died at a private hospital in Delhi on 26 August 2022, at the age of 87.

See also 
Jamaat-e-Islami Hind
Abul A'la Maududi
Students Islamic Organisation of India

References

External links 
 Debate on triple talaq unnecessary: Sayed Jalaluddin Umri Financial Express (newspaper)
Jamaat-e-Islami Hind official website

 

1935 births
2022 deaths
Indian Muslims
Aligarh Muslim University alumni
Writers from Tamil Nadu
Indian Islamic religious leaders
Indian Sunni Muslim scholars of Islam
People from Tiruvannamalai district